Ocean Township may refer to the following places in the United States:

 Ocean Township, Ocean County, New Jersey
 Ocean Township, Monmouth County, New Jersey

Township name disambiguation pages